Angel Martín (born June 18, 1918) is a former Associate Justice of the Supreme Court of Puerto Rico, appointed by Governor Luis A. Ferré in 1971, after having served as Secretary of the Puerto Rico Department of the Treasury, or "Hacienda".

Born in Corozal, Puerto Rico, Martín obtained a bachelor's degree in economics in 1939 and an MBA in 1940, both from the University of Pennsylvania, After grduatng from the Army ROTC and was activated in 1940 to active duty in the United States Army, was send to Fort Benning for advance officer school. Served as Military Aide to Governor Rexford Tugwell during World War II and actually lived in the Governor's Mansion, "La Fortaleza".  After the war, he continued in government service and obtained his law degree in 1953 from the Tulane University Law School.

Served as Secretary of Treasury of Puerto Rico from 1970 until 1971.

Was appointed to the Supreme Court of Puerto Rico and served as an Associate Justice for eleven years until his retirement in 1982.

Married to the former Carmen Viola García, he is the father of University of Puerto Rico law professor and former Senator Fernando Martín, the Executive President of the Puerto Rican Independence Party (PIP).

Martín Taboas turned 100 in June 2018.

|-

Reference

Sources 

La Justicia en sus Manos by Luis Rafael Rivera, 

1918 births
American military personnel of World War II
Associate Justices of the Supreme Court of Puerto Rico
Living people
People from Corozal, Puerto Rico
Puerto Rican lawyers
Secretaries of Treasury of Puerto Rico
Tulane University Law School alumni
University of Pennsylvania alumni
Wharton School of the University of Pennsylvania alumni
Puerto Rican judges
Puerto Rican centenarians
Men centenarians
United States Army officers